Belleville is a historic unincorporated community in Grand Forks County, North Dakota, United States. In 1884, it had one of 22 post offices in Grand Forks County. It has an elevation of 1155 feet.

References

Populated places in Grand Forks County, North Dakota
Unincorporated communities in Grand Forks County, North Dakota
Unincorporated communities in North Dakota